Equator is the sixteenth studio album by English rock band Uriah Heep, released in 1985. It marked the studio return of bassist Trevor Bolder, who had rejoined the band for the Head First tour. The band also had a new record label, Portrait Records, a subsidiary of CBS. Equator was also the last Uriah Heep album to feature vocalist Peter Goalby & keyboardist John Sinclair.

The tour programme would be Heep's last in the UK until the Wake the Sleeper tour, which began in 2008.

When the Heep back catalogue was issued on CD in the early 1990s by Castle and then remastered, with bonus tracks, in the mid-to-late 1990s by Essential, Equator was conspicuous by its absence. This was because Sony/CBS wanted what was considered an extortionate sum for the rights. The album ultimately had a CD release in 1999, with no bonus material whatsoever. When the Essential remasters were expanded and reissued in the early 2000s by Sanctuary, Equator had to be passed over once again. However, in 2010, the album finally saw a release in expanded and remastered format, in time for its 25th anniversary, thus finally ending Sanctuary's remaster-series.

After this Uriah Heep took an extended break from the recording studio, and their next studio album would not appear until 1989.

Track listing
All songs by Uriah Heep, except "Gypsy" by Mick Box and David Byron

Personnel
Uriah Heep
Mick Box – guitars, backing vocals
Lee Kerslake – drums
John Sinclair – keyboards, backing vocals
Peter Goalby – vocals
Trevor Bolder – bass, backing vocals

Production
Tony Platt – producer, engineer, Synclavier programming
Gary Moberly – Fairlight programming
John Hallett, Stephen McLaughlin, Phil Tennant, Paul Corkette, John Levell – assistant engineers

Singles
"Rockarama" was released as a single, including a shaped picture-disc, and a video was made for the song. The B-side was non-album track "Backstage Girl". "Poor Little Rich Girl" was also released as a single, with live B-sides.

Charts

References

External links
 The Official Uriah Heep Discography

Uriah Heep (band) albums
1985 albums
Portrait Records albums
Columbia Records albums
Albums produced by Tony Platt